Ibou Omar Touray (born 24 December 1994) is a professional footballer who plays as a left back for  club Salford City. Born in England, he represents Gambia internationally, qualifying through his father.

Touray began his career with local team Everton, but left in 2014 having made no appearances for the first team. He spent successive seasons in the lower leagues with Chester, Rhyl, and Nantwich Town, before signing for National League North team Salford City in 2017. He helped them achieve back to back promotions in his first two seasons, first to the National League and then to League Two, the first time Salford had reached the English Football League in their history. He is the longest serving player in the clubs' history, and helped the club win the 2020 EFL Trophy Final. Since 2022, he has been the team captain.

Touray made his international debut for Gambia in 2015, and represented his country at the 2021 Africa Cup of Nations, their first ever major international tournament, helping Gambia to reach the quarter-finals.

Club career

Everton
Born in Toxteth, Liverpool, Touray started his career at Everton, having joined the club in 2011. He was close of joining Liverpool before joining Everton instead. After progressing through the Everton's youth system, he signed his first professional contract at the club in July 2013. Although he was given a number 40 shirt in the 2013–14 season, he was released by the club in May 2014.

Chester

After leaving Everton in the summer, Touray went on a trial at Tranmere Rovers. After the trial was unsuccessful, he joined Chester on 13 September 2014, having caught the eye of manager Steve Burr during a pre-season game between Tranmere and Chester.

After appearing as an unused substitute against Woking, Touray made his Chester debut three days later joining the club, coming on as a first half substitute, in a 2–0 win over Southport. Since making his Chester debut, Touray quickly established himself in the starting eleven at the club, playing in the left-midfield position. His performance attracted attention from League One side Oldham Athletic, which he appeared on the substitute bench on two occasions. After returning, he appeared in every match until he was sent-off for a "wild challenge" on Nicky Clee, in a 4–1 loss to Altrincham on 31 December 2014. Although he served a three match suspension, Touray, however, lost his first team place for the rest of the season and was released by the club.

Rhyl
After leaving Chester, Touray moved to Wales when he joined Rhyl.

Touray made his Rhyl debut in the opening game of the season, in a 1–1 draw against Bangor City on 21 August 2015, starting the whole game. Since making his Rhyl debut, he established himself in the starting eleven for the side despite missing out one game through suspension. It wasn't until on 9 April 2016 when Touray scored his first goals, in a 5–0 win over Port Talbot Town. Rhyl had not won in 16 matches and faced accusations of match fixing due to suspicious betting patterns. At the end of the season, Touray went on to make a total of 29 appearances and scoring two times in total.

After one season at Rhyl, Touray was released by Rhyl in May 2016.

Nantwich Town
After being released by Rhyl, he signed for Nantwich Town. His move came after at a recommendation from the club's manager Dave Cooke.

Touray made his Nantwich Town debut in the opening game of the season, in a 1–1 draw against Ashton United. Throughout the season, Touray established himself in the starting eleven at Nantwich Town as a left-back. He'a also played a role when the club won 5–3 in the penalty shootout to the final of Cheshire Senior Cup against Warrington Town. However, the club went on to lose the final after losing to Crewe Alexandra 3–2.

After making 41 appearances in all competitions, Touray was awarded the club's Young Player of the Year.

Salford City

In May 2017, he signed for Salford City. Touray made his Salford City debut in the opening game of the season, in a 2–0 loss against Darlington. Following an impressive 2020–21 season, Touray was named in the 2020–21 EFL League Two Team of the Season at the league's annual awards ceremony.

On 22 June 2021, Touray signed a new two-year contract; Touray and manager Gary Bowyer both cited a connection with Salford's supporters as being key to the new deal. On 14 January 2023, he made his 250th Salford appearance in a 2–0 league win against Sutton United.

International career
He made his international debut for Gambia in 2015. Touray is eligible for Gambia through his father, who moved to England aged 16, and is one of several of the Gambian diaspora called up who helped the country's results improve. In a 2021 interview, Touray said that his proudest moment in international football was when Gambia drew 1–1 with Algeria, who at the time were unbeaten in over two years.

Touray played in the 2021 Africa Cup of Nations, his national team's first continental tournament, where they made the quarter-final. He described representing the country at the tournament, as well as visiting the residency of Adama Barrow, the President of the Gambia, as "surreal". He missed the knockout stage match against Guinea through illness,

Career statistics

Honours
Salford City
 National League North: 2017–18
National League play-offs: 2019
EFL Trophy: 2019–20

Individual
EFL League Two Team of the Season: 2020–21

References

External links

1994 births
Living people
English footballers
People with acquired Gambian citizenship
Gambian footballers
The Gambia international footballers
Association football fullbacks
Everton F.C. players
Chester F.C. players
Rhyl F.C. players
Nantwich Town F.C. players
Salford City F.C. players
Cymru Premier players
English people of Gambian descent
Footballers from Liverpool
People from Toxteth
2021 Africa Cup of Nations players
Black British sportspeople